Chris Carpenter is an American sound engineer. He has been nominated for 3 Academy Awards in the category Best Sound. He has worked on more than 130 films since 1979.

Selected filmography
 Geronimo: An American Legend (1993)
 Independence Day (1996)
 The Mummy (1999)

References

External links

Year of birth missing (living people)
Living people
American audio engineers